2002 ACC tournament may refer to:

 2002 ACC men's basketball tournament
 2002 ACC women's basketball tournament
 2002 ACC men's soccer tournament
 2002 ACC women's soccer tournament
 2002 Atlantic Coast Conference baseball tournament
 2002 Atlantic Coast Conference softball tournament